Abdullah Fusseini (born 1 July 1982) is a Ghanaian former footballer.

Career
He has previously played for King Faisal Babes, Torino, Gualdo, Casale, Gubbio and Melfi.

International career
Fusseini won one cap for the Black Stars in the 2006 FIFA World Cup qualification against Tunisia national football team 2006.

References

External links

1982 births
Living people
Ghanaian footballers
Ghana international footballers
Ghanaian expatriate footballers
Expatriate footballers in Italy
Serie A players
Torino F.C. players
Casale F.B.C. players
Ghanaian expatriate sportspeople in Italy
U.S. Catanzaro 1929 players
Footballers from Accra
A.S. Melfi players
A.S. Gualdo Casacastalda players
King Faisal Babes FC players
A.S. Gubbio 1910 players
Association football midfielders